"Again" is a song recorded by Japanese singer Shizuka Kudo for her debut solo studio album, Mysterious. Pony Canyon released the track as the second single from Mysterious on December 2, 1987, in both 12-inch vinyl and maxi single format.

Background
"Again" was Kudo's first solo release following the disbandment of the idol girl group Onyanko Club, which she joined in 1986. The song was the ending theme for the CX teen drama and variety television series Momoiro Gakuen Toshi Sengen!!, of which Kudo herself was a cast member.

Composition
"Again" was put together by the same songwriting duo as Kudo's debut single: it was written by Yasushi Akimoto and composed, arranged and produced by Tsugutoshi Gotō. The song is composed in the key of E minor and set to a tempo of 140 beats per minute. Kudo's vocals span one octave, from B3 to B4. Lyrically, the song talks about a woman breaking off a romantic relationship because of her feelings of inadequacy.

Critical reception
The song is described by CDJournal as a bouncy midtempo track with a funky and unusually complicated melody line for an idol singer's second single. Kudo was praised for matching the song with an effortless vocal performance, and for showcasing potential for breaking out of the idol mold.

Chart performance
The single debuted at number three on the Oricon Singles Chart, selling 61,000 copies in its first week. It dropped to number seven the following week, with 20,000 copies sold. "Again" stayed in the top 100 for a total of twelve weeks and ranked number 53 on the year-end Oricon Singles Chart for 1987.

Track listing

Charts

References

1987 songs
1987 singles
Songs with lyrics by Yasushi Akimoto
Shizuka Kudo songs
Pony Canyon singles
Songs written by Tsugutoshi Gotō